Savage Fury is a 1985 pornographic thriller written and directed by Mark Carriere and co-written by Tina Marie. It was followed by Savage Fury 2 in 1989 and Savage Fury 3 in 1994.

Plot 
Outside a pizzeria, a trio of ne'er-do-wells sexually harass three coeds, prompting one of the girls to slap and shove the men's leader, Clint, who threatens to get even. That night, the three thugs, with the help of two other toughs, break into the girls' dormitory at the Central State University. The quintet rape the five women inside, and, afterward, one of the girls vows: "You mark my words, I'll get you in the end!" A year later, one of the women spots four of the five rapists at a bar, so she gets in touch with the other victims, and, together, they plot to get revenge on their assailants.

The women split up and pose as prostitutes, with each seducing one of the rapists and luring them to a secluded area. The girls have sex with the men, and, when they finish, they remind them of the events of the previous year, before gunning them down with automatic firearms.

Cast
 Christy Canyon as Sandra Davis
 Craig Roberts as Rapist
 April Maye as Tammy
 Bunny Bleu as Lenore
 Josephine Carrington as Janie
 Beverly Bliss as Sondra
 David Sanders as Rapist
 Rick Savage as Clint
 Peter North as Rapist
 Tony Martino as Rapist

Reception 
Adam Film World gave Savage Fury a 3.5 out of 5 ("Hot") while Hustler Erotic Video gave it a 3/4. AVN's Alvin Zbryski awarded a 3 out of a possible 5 and wrote, "Stylish, moody, loaded with glistening sex and ultimately, extremely disturbing, Savage Fury takes a standard exploitation film theme, rape and revenge, and brings it to new sexual and violent heights".

References

External links
 
 
 

1985 films
Camcorder films
Fiction about murder
1985 thriller films
Films set in Indiana
Films shot in Indiana
1980s English-language films
American rape and revenge films
American thriller films
1980s pornographic films
Pornographic film series
Pornographic horror films
1985 direct-to-video films
American pornographic films
Direct-to-video film series
American direct-to-video films
Direct-to-video thriller films
1980s American films